Ürümqi People's Broadcasting Station (short: UBS) was a radio station broadcasting to Ürümqi and the Xinjiang province area. It was operated by the Xinjiang Networking Transmission Limited in Mandarin and Uyghur. It existed from 1979 until 2019 when it merged with Ürümqi Television forming Ürümqi Radio and TV Station.

Furthermore from 1949 to 1951 the Xinjiang People's Broadcasting Station was named after Ürümqi instead of Xinjiang in Uyghur ( Díhuà in Chinese).

List of programmes

See also
 Xinjiang People's Broadcasting Station
 Ürümqi

External links

Directory of FM radio stations in the region Xinjiang Uygur 

Chinese-language radio stations
Mandarin-language radio stations
Mass media in Ürümqi
Radio stations in China
Radio stations established in 1979
1979 establishments in China